The Lulua Mosque or al-Lu'lu'a Mosque is a mosque in Cairo, Egypt, that was built in 1015–16 AD. It was constructed during the reign of the third Fatimid caliph, al-Hakim, in the Fatimid architectural style. The mosque was almost-fully collapsed in 1919, but was later refurbished in 1998 by the Dawoodi Bohras, who trace their religious lineage to the Fatimid Caliphate's Shia Islam. It is located in the southern cemetery in the Moqattam hills.

Geography
The mosque is located near the southern cemetery of the Muqattam Hills, a low range of hills to the east of Cairo. It is divided into three sections. The highest segment is a low mountain landform called Moqattam Mountain. It was an important ancient Egyptian quarry site for limestone, used in construction of mosques and churches. The Lulua Mosque was also built with this limestone. The mosque is close to this hill range.

History
Fatimid Caliph al-Hakim (996–1021), the third caliph in Egypt of the Ismaili Shia Dynasty, also credited with establishing various buildings in Cairo, built this mosque among many small mosques that were built on the Muqattam Hill. It is told that Hakim used to visit the mosque alone in nights for worship.
 The name al-Lu'lu'a means "the pearl" as the mosque's exterior appearance was ornate and lustrous.

Features

The Fatimid mosque was built on a promontory of limestone, precariously perched as a detached component of the hill range. The exposed limestone formed the foundation for the mosque structure. The mosque was built in the unique Fatimid architectural style. It is one of the early mosques built in Egypt, where the typical Fatimid architectural style, which involved portals with slight protrusions, mihrabs and qibla walls (covered by ornamentation) topped by domes indicative of the place of worship, columned porches with triple arches or keel shaped arches, frontage with inscriptions could be seen. The Lulua Mosque consisted originally of a three-storey tower-like structure built over a rectangular plan. The ground floor was partially excavated from the hill. It was barrel vaulted having triple arched entrance, simple qibla (mihrab) on the back wall at each floor( multiple qibla in one mosque a unique feature for this mosque) and was constructed of limestone with rubble. The upper stories were constructed with bricks and interior wall plastered. One of these upper stories also had triple arched entrance; the arches were built with brick and stone. The middle floor, barrel vaulted, had an ornamented qibla (Mihrab) at back and one rectangular window. The top floor had two compartments, each having one window. The vaults at the upper floors were built with brick. Historical photo placed confirm many details.

Some of the architectural features common to all mosques built by Al-Hakim, including Lulua Mosque, are adoption of projected portals and domes over mihrabs for ceremonial purposes. Keel-shaped arches in porticoes and arcades were also prominent features. The profusion of fine stucco decorations were seen in large numbers, particularly on mihrabs and qibla walls. Iconographic inscriptions were abundant on the façade.

The first reported refurbishing of the mosque was in the 16th century. After its façade and vaults collapsed in 1919, the mosque was refurbished by India's Dawoodi Bohra community in the late 1990s. The Bohras trace their religious lineage to the Ismāʿīlī Islam practiced by the Fatimid Caliphate.

A manzara) was also built near the mosque, which was used as guest house for foreign visitors and subsequently converted into a hostel for merchants visiting from other countries.

See also
 Lists of mosques
 List of mosques in Africa
 List of mosques in Egypt

References 

11th-century mosques
Lula Mosque
Mosques in Cairo
Medieval Cairo
Religious buildings and structures completed in 1016
Mosques completed in 1998
11th-century establishments in the Fatimid Caliphate
20th-century religious buildings and structures in Egypt